Vivir may refer to:

"Vivir" (song), a 2004 song by Belinda, from the album Belinda
Vivir (album), a 1997 album by Enrique Iglesias